The 1969 season was the Hawthorn Football Club's 45th season in the Victorian Football League and 68th overall.

Fixture

Premiership season

Ladder

References

Hawthorn Football Club seasons